Si Bon (also Romanized as Sī Bon) is a village in Langarud Rural District, Salman Shahr District, Abbasabad County, Mazandaran Province, Iran. At the 2006 census, its population was 350, in 82 families.

References 

Populated places in Abbasabad County